Francis Luke Askew (March 26, 1932 – March 29, 2012) was an American actor. He appeared in many westerns, and had a lead role in the spaghetti Western Night of the Serpent (La notte dei serpenti; 1969). He also had a small part in the 1969 classic movie Easy Rider.

Biography
Askew was born on March 26, 1932 in Macon, Georgia, to Milton Dillard Askew (1904–1976) and Dorothy Doolittle (1910–1969). Askew attended the University of Georgia, Mercer University, and Walter F. George School of Law. Askew served in the United States Air Force during his college years.

He started his professional career in radio and television, and as a rock and blues singer. He made his film debut in Hurry Sundown (1967), but was first noticed as an actor for his role in Cool Hand Luke (1967). The following year he worked with John Wayne in The Green Berets (with his hair cut short). The following year he worked with Dennis Hopper and Peter Fonda in Easy Rider.

Askew continued to work as an actor after that, predominantly appearing in guest roles on television series. This includes work on such series as: Bonanza, The High Chaparral, Mission: Impossible, Cannon,  The Rockford Files, Quincy, M.E., The Six Million Dollar Man, T. J. Hooker, L.A. Law, MacGyver, Walker, Texas Ranger, Murder She Wrote, and HBO's Big Love. 

He also took part in Easy Rider: Shaking the Cage (1999), a  documentary about the making of Easy Rider, and the 2003 documentary Easy Riders, Raging Bulls: How the Sex, Drugs and Rock 'N' Roll Generation Saved Hollywood. Askew sang Muddy Waters, Howlin' Wolf and Jimmy Reed songs at The Gaslight Cafe. 
According to Bob Dylan, when Luke sang at The Gaslight Cafe it was like a "guy who sounded like Bobby Blue Bland".

Askew later moved to Lake Oswego, Oregon. He died at Lake Oswego on March 29, 2012, three days after his 80th birthday, due to lung cancer.

Selected filmography

Hurry Sundown (1967) .... Dolph Higginson
The Happening (1967) .... Second Motorcycle Officer
Cool Hand Luke (1967) .... Boss Paul
Will Penny (1967) .... Foxy
The Devil's Brigade (1968) .... Private Hubert Hixon
The Green Berets (1968) .... Sergeant Provo
Easy Rider (1969) .... Stranger on Highway
Flareup (1969) .... Alan Moris
Night of the Serpent (1969) .... Luke
Angel Unchained (1970) .... Jonathan Tremaine
The Culpepper Cattle Company (1972) .... Luke
The Great Northfield Minnesota Raid (1972) .... Jim Younger
The Magnificent Seven Ride! (1972) .... Mark Skinner
Pat Garrett and Billy the Kid (1973) .... Eno
Slipstream (1973) .... Mike Mallard
A Matter of Wife... and Death (1975) .... Snell
Posse (1975) .... Krag
Walking Tall Part 2 (1975) .... Pinky Dobson
Mackintosh and T.J.  (1975) .... Cal
Rolling Thunder (1977) .... Automatic Slim
Wanda Nevada (1979) .... Ruby Muldoon
The Beast Within (1982) .... Dexter Ward
The Warrior and the Sorceress (1984) .... Zeg the Tyrant
Bialy smok (1987) .... Frank Brown
Bulletproof (1988) .... Gen. Gallo
Back to Back (1989) .... Wade Duro
No Retreat, No Surrender 3: Blood Brothers (1990) .... Atteron
Dune Warriors (1991) .... William
The Friends of Harry (1995) .... Harry
Frank & Jesse (1995) .... Lone Rider
Savage (1996) .... Capt. Rohmer
Traveller (1997) .... Boss Jack Costello
The Newton Boys (1998) .... Chief Schoemaker
South of Heaven, West of Hell (2000) .... Leland Henry
Frailty (2001) .... Sheriff Smalls
The Greatest Game Ever Played (2005) .... Alec Campbell

Television
Mission: Impossible (1968) – The Execution .... Victor Pietro Duchell
 The High Chaparral (1969) – Shadow on the Wind .... Johnny Ringo
 Bonanza (1971; part of last season that was not aired*) – Kingdom of Fear .... Deputy Hatch
 Bearcats! (1971) – Man in a Cage .... Greer 
 S.W.A.T. (1975) - Murder By Fire .... Todd
 Police Story (1975/1976) - 2 Episodes - Headhunter/Eamon Kinsella Royce .... Blue/Nicholson
 BJ and the Bear (1979) .... Blackwell
 Knight Rider (1983) - A Nice, Indecent Little Town .... Ron Austin
 Big Love (2007–2010) .... Hollis Green (final appearance)

References

External links

1932 births
2012 deaths
20th-century American male actors
21st-century American male actors
Actors from Macon, Georgia
American male film actors
American male television actors
Deaths from lung cancer in Oregon
Male actors from Georgia (U.S. state)
Mercer University alumni
People from Lake Oswego, Oregon
University of Georgia alumni
United States Air Force airmen